The Chevrolet Cavalier is a line of compact cars produced by Chevrolet.  Serving as the replacement of the Chevrolet Monza, the Cavalier was the second Chevrolet model line to adopt front-wheel drive.  Three versions of the Cavalier have been sold, including three generations sold in North America sold from the 1982 to 2005 model years, a version produced by SAIC-GM for China from 2016 to 2021, and a SAIC-GM version produced for Mexico since the 2019 model year.

The Cavalier was among the inaugural vehicles of the GM J platform.  One of the first "world cars" of General Motors, the J platform was developed for use by each North American GM division (with the exception of GMC), alongside models from Opel, Vauxhall, and Holden.  Though sharing chassis underpinnings, J-body cars from Europe and Australia used slightly different body designs and different powertrains; in Europe, the Vauxhall Cavalier and Opel Ascona were marketed as mid-size cars.  Initially a divisional counterpart of the Buick Skyhawk, Cadillac Cimarron, Oldsmobile Firenza, and Pontiac J2000, the Cavalier was primarily marketed alongside the Pontiac Sunbird (renamed the Pontiac Sunfire for 1995).

The 1982-2005 Cavalier was produced by multiple GM facilities across North America.  For 2005, the Chevrolet Cobalt replaced the model line in North America.

Predecessors 
The Cavalier began development in the late 1970s, as Chevrolet sought to replace the compact Monza with a front-wheel drive model line sized between the Chevrolet Chevette subcompact and the front-wheel drive Nova replacement (which was renamed the Chevrolet Citation for production). Serving as a replacement for the Vega, the Monza was offered as a 2-door notchback coupe, 3-door hatchback, and 3-door station wagon (sharing the body of the Vega wagon).

Marketed as one of the smallest and lowest-price American cars, the Chevette hatchback was closer in size to the Volkswagen Beetle, competing primarily against subcompacts from Japanese-brand manufacturers, including the Honda Civic, Datsun B210 and Toyota Corolla.  Following the introduction of the Dodge Omni and Ford Fiesta, American manufacturers began transitioning towards front-wheel drive in compacts and subcompacts, through domestically produced vehicles and through the use of captive imports.

Along with developing up-to-date chassis underpinnings to replace the Monza, GM sought to expand the market appeal of new model line by expanding the number of available body styles.  The notchback coupe and three-door hatchback would make a return, joined by a four-door sedan and five-door station wagon (two body styles offered in mid-size and full-size Chevrolets).

First generation (1982–1987) 

The Cavalier first went on sale in May 1981 as a 1982 model with front-wheel-drive, a choice of two carbureted versions of the GM 122 series four-cylinder pushrod engines, and 2 and 4-door sedan, hatchback, and station wagon body styles. Convertibles were added in 1983, initial production totaling less than 1000.  The Cavalier name originated from GM's then-British subsidiary Vauxhall, who applied it to badge engineered variants of the Opel Ascona, the third generation of which was the first J-body car to be released.

For 1982, the 1.8 liter carbureted L46 inline 4 was the sole engine available, and it could be mated to either a 4-speed manual, or 3-speed automatic transmission. The Cavalier could be bought in 4 body styles; a 2-door coupe, 3-door hatchback, 4-door sedan, and a 4-door station wagon and was offered with three trim packages to include the entry level Cadet, the mid-level Base and the upscale CL, which could be optioned with two-tone paint, accent stripes and aluminum alloy wheels. The suspension was shared with the front-wheel-drive Citation and Celebrity, which consisted of MacPherson struts, lower control arms, coil springs and a stabilizer bar for the front, while a solid beam axle, trailing arms, variable-rate coil springs for the rear suspension on all body styles were unique to the Cavalier.

For 1983, the 2.0 liter throttle body fuel-injected LQ5 inline 4 replaced the L46 engine found in the 1982 Cavalier, and a 5-speed manual transmission was made available. A convertible model produced by American Sunroof was added to the lineup late in the model year. This Cavalier model was the first convertible produced by Chevrolet since the Caprice convertible was discontinued in 1975.

For 1984, the Cavalier's styling was lightly refreshed, featuring a new grill and quad headlight design. The Type 10 package, initially offered on only the hatchback, was added to the coupe and convertible models. 5,161 Cavaliers that originated from South Gate Assembly were equipped with an Olympic special appearance package to celebrate the 1984 Summer Olympics.

For 1985, the 2.8 liter LB6 V6 was added as an option for the Cavalier. It was meant to debut with the Z24 package, but the Z24 package was delayed until 1986. The V6 was available as an option on all trim levels.

For 1986, the Z24 package was added as on option for the coupe and hatchback models. It features digital gauges, sport wheels, a ground effects kit, and a specific front facia. The Type 10 package was discontinued and replaced with the RS series, which was now available on all body styles.

For 1987, both available engines were refreshed for their second generation. The LQ5 inline-four was updated to the LL8 designation, which added 5 horsepower and replaced the distributor with a coil pack ignition system. The LB6 V6 added aluminum cylinder heads, different fuel injectors, and electronic spark control.

Engines
 1982: 1.8 L L46 carbureted OHV I4
 1983-1986: 2.0 L LQ5 TBI OHV I4
 1987: 2.0 L LL8 TBI OHV I4
 1985–1989: 2.8 L LB6 MPFI OHV V6

Second generation (1988–1994)  

The Cavalier was restyled in 1987 for the 1988 model year. The 3-door hatchback was dropped, while the coupe, sedan, wagon and convertible carried over. The sedan and wagon were unchanged from the doors back, while the coupe's exterior was completely redesigned. This resulted in different trunk designs for the coupe and sedan. Three trim levels were available for 1988: VL for Value Leader, RS, and Z24. The convertible was only available as a Z24, and the dashboard unit from the Type 10 was installed in coupes and convertibles with the Z24 appearance, while the VL and RS used the dashboard unit shared with the Sunbird and Cimarron. The VL and RS came standard with the 2.0 L OHV L4 engine, now upgraded to throttle-body injection, or TBI, producing , while the 2.8 L V6 producing  was optional on the RS and standard on the Z24. With two-door models, a 5-speed manual transmission was standard and a 3-speed automatic was optional, however the 3-speed automatic was made standard on sedans and wagons. An electronic dashboard was available with the RS and Z24 trims, while the front suspension carried over from the previous generation and the rear suspension adopted the torsion-beam rear axle, along with coil springs and rear stabilizer bars from the discontinued Buick Skyhawk, Oldsmobile Firenza and Cadillac Cimarron.

For 1989, the steering column was redesigned. The new self-aligning steering wheel was designed so as to reduce injuries in a collision by bending to conform to the driver's chest. Also, rear shoulder belts became standard on all models. RS and Z24 custom cloth seating received a new style of front bucket seats with integral headrests. The optional V6 was retooled to 130 hp.

Door-mounted automatic front seatbelts were added due to US passive restraint legislation. The optional V6 engine was also upgraded to the 3.1 L V6 and 140 horsepower. The convertible was dropped from availability to prevent internal competition with a planned Beretta convertible. However, the Beretta convertible was shelved at the eleventh hour, before a 1990 Cavalier convertible could be prepared.

The 1991 Cavalier got a more extensive restyling that involved a new hood, bumpers, headlights, taillights, wheel covers and a redesigned interior; however, the body style remained unchanged. Most notably, the cooling system was redesigned to draw air from the bumper, giving it a Ford Taurus-style bumper and grille-less nose. The new bumpers were unpainted, with the option to have them colored grey, black or white, the latter only available on white-colored models. The RS and the Z24 eschewed this for a color keyed body package. Z24 models also gained the options for a height-adjustable driver's seat and a CD player. The platform and trim lines were carried over, while the convertible was brought back mid-year in the RS trim only with the V6 standard.

Minor changes for 1991 also included the Alpha Tech ignition lock cylinder, which incorporated a dual-bit key that was larger and thicker in size in comparison to the old single-bit lock cylinder system that had been used for years. The lock system was intended to be a stronger deterrent to vehicle theft, but constant problems were reported with the lock jamming. It was dropped after an improved dual-bit single key system was introduced for the 1995 model year and redesign.

The convertible was now available in both RS and Z24 trims, with the V6 standard in the Z24 and optional with the RS. Anti-lock brakes were added as a standard feature, as Delco Moraine had managed to develop a low-cost system. Power locks were also standard, and were designed to automatically lock when the car is shifted out of park, or if the car is traveling at least 8 miles per hour in manual transmission equipped coupe models.

Model year 1993 brought minimal changes to the Cavalier line. The convertibles received a glass rear window, allowing rear window defrost as an option.  Also, the RS trim received a minor styling change, doing away with its grille slot.

The 1994 models were also carryovers, as a redesign of the Cavalier was in development. Both of the wagon's trim levels—the VL and RS—were dropped, but the body style continued to be marketed in an unnamed base trim that was essentially the same as the VL. The 2.2 L OHV L4 was now converted to the SFI version found in the Corsica, which delivered an output of 120 horsepower. Additional changes included a slightly redesigned climate control interface and the power locking system being again redesigned: the doors would still lock automatically when put into gear, but they would also unlock automatically when the ignition was switched off.

Mexico
The Chevrolet Cavalier was introduced in Mexico in model year 1990 to replace the Chevrolet Celebrity, which had been until then the entry point to the Mexican GM lineup. The initial offering consisted only of a 4-door sedan with a 2.8 L MPFI V6 with a 5-speed manual gearbox, or a 3-speed automatic as an option.

For 1991, it got the same redesign as in the United States and was now also offered as a coupé. The coupé Cavalier Z24 was also introduced in Mexico with a 3.1 L V6, with both manual or automatic transmissions. For 1992, the Mexican Cavalier continued unchanged.

For 1993, the Mexican Chevrolet Cavalier adopted the aesthetics from the Pontiac Sunbird. For 1993 and 1994, the Cavaliers sold there featured Sunbird body panels, as opposed to US-spec Cavalier panels and the Mexican Chevrolet Cavalier Z24 took on the appearance of the Pontiac Sunbird GT sold in the United States. No wagons and convertibles were offered in Mexico.

Third generation (1995–2005) 

The Cavalier received its first total redesign for 1995, with expanded dimensions and more aerodynamic styling, incorporating minor design cues from the fourth generation Chevrolet Camaro. Some of the basic styling cues remained however, such as the bumper-integrated grille and the coupes' dipped beltline. Coupe, sedan, and convertible options were offered, however the wagon model was discontinued, and later  replaced with the Chevrolet HHR in 2005. The car now had the available option of 15 and 16-inch wheels. By 1997, the Cavalier became the best selling car within the entire GM lineup.

For the third generation, powertrain options were limited to inline-four engines. The option for a V6 engine, which had been available in the first and second generation, was dropped and replaced by a new four-cylinder of similar power output. Base and RS models still retained the 2.2-litre pushrod four-cylinder engine (2.2 L OHV) of the previous models, which was primarily mated to a 3-speed automatic, but was available with 5-speed manual in the two-door models, in particular the RS models. As of 1996 a new 4-speed automatic became available in any trim; this had originally been intended to be introduced along with the redesign but General Motors' cash shortage delayed it. The Z24 and LS convertible used the 2.3 L LD2 Quad-4 engine in 1995, but they received a new engine in 1996, the 2.4 liter DOHC LD9. This engine could also be special ordered on a 4-door LS model.

In 2000, the car gained a minor facelift consisting of bigger headlights and an improved grille, lost the "CHEVROLET" text badge at the trunklid and gained a new "CAVALIER" badge along with new "five spoke" hubcaps. The 2.4-litre engine came mated standard with the Getrag F23 5-speed manual transmission on the Z24 models, or with the optional 4-speed automatic on both the Z24 and the LS models. The Z24 only came in 2-door coupe models until 2001 and featured a sport-tuned suspension, 16-inch tires, alloy wheels and improved interior electronics. Aesthetically little changed from the other models other than a ground effects kit and taller rear spoiler. In 2000, a 4-door Z24 Sedan debuted, featuring the same mechanics but having a less sporty body. The Z24 trim also received several other upgrades including a wider front sway bar and FE2 Sports Suspension for better handling characteristics, and less aggressive ABS anti-lock braking system.

In 2002, the 3-speed automatic was dropped from the base models equipped with the 2.2, and the 4-speed automatic became the main offering across the entire lineup, with 5-speed still available in the two-door cars. These engines improved fuel economy, featuring the same displacement as the GM 122 Pushrod Engine (2.2 L OHV) while maintaining most of the power of the older LD9 motors. The new Ecotec motors replaced the GM 122 Pushrod Engine (2.2 L OHV) in base models in 2003, and became the sole engine choice in the entire Cavalier line-up until 2005 when the Chevrolet Cavalier was replaced by the Chevrolet Cobalt.

A GM Eaton M45 Supercharger kit was also offered for the Z24 trim as well. The supercharger kit was developed and tested by General Motors and could only be installed at a GM dealer.

Facelifts
The third generation Cavalier had two facelifts. There was a minor one in 1999 with new front and rear bumper fascias which included revised headlamps and taillamps for 2000 models. There was a more extensive refresh in 2002 for the 2003 model year, which included a complete new front end design, revised taillamps with a full-width rear reflector, a new rear spoiler and rear bumper fascia.

Safety
The third-generation Cavalier earned several low scores in crash tests by the Insurance Institute for Highway Safety and National Highway Traffic Safety Administration. Also, IIHS fatality risks statistics rated the Cavalier among the "highest rates of driver deaths", with 150 (four-door) to 171 (two-door) driver deaths per million registered vehicle years. Average for the Cavalier class (small) was 103 (four-door) to 134 (two-door) driver deaths per million registered vehicle years.

The IIHS gave the 1995-2005 Cavalier a "poor" overall score in their frontal offset collision test.

2005 National Highway Traffic Safety Administration (NHTSA) Crash Test Ratings (coupe):

Frontal driver: 
Frontal passenger: 
Side rear driver:  *safety concern*
Side rear passenger: 
Rollover: 

2002 National Highway Traffic Safety Administration (NHTSA) Crash Test Ratings (sedan):

Frontal driver: 
Frontal passenger: 
Side rear driver:  *safety concern*
Side rear passenger: 
Rollover:

Toyota Cavalier

 

Aside from the fact that it was right hand drive, the Toyota Cavalier also featured a leather-wrapped shift knob, steering wheel and park brake lever, wider front fenders, amber turn signals for Japanese regulations, power folding side mirrors, side turn signal repeater lights on the front fenders, and carpeting on the inside of the trunk lid. Interior seats were often flecked with color, and the rear seat had a fold-down armrest. Vehicles produced from February through December 1998 were available with a leather interior equipped with an automatic transmission only.

All models featured wheels borrowed from the Pontiac Sunfire. The Toyota Cavalier was available in 2.4G and 2.4Z trim levels. While all Chevrolet-badged Cavaliers received a facelift for 2000, the Toyota did as well with the updated center console, head-lights/hood/front bumper, tail-lights, and colors available. TRD made a body kit and rear wing for the Cavalier, available exclusively in Japan. The car was sold only at Toyota Store Japanese dealerships.

The Cavalier was not the only GM product sold in Japan; the Saturn S-series was sold at Saturn dealerships (some former Isuzu dealerships) from 1996 until 2003, and some Toyota Vista Stores also retailed Saturns.

The Cavalier was entirely produced by GM in the US at the Lordstown Assembly location, and sold from 1995 to 2000. The 1996-2000 Toyota Cavaliers came equipped with the 2.4 L LD9 engine, while the 1995 used the 2.3 L Quad 4. Due to the engine displacement and width dimensions ( for the coupe,  for the sedan) exceeding Japanese government regulations concerning exterior dimensions and maximum engine displacement, it was not considered a "compact" so it was sold as a "normal-class car" like the Toyota Mark II and Nissan Skyline. Prices for the coupe started at 2 million yen for the coupe, and  1.81 million yen for the sedan. the final Toyota Cavalier was imported in 2000.

The introduction of the Toyota Cavalier was not the first time the Cavalier was sold in Japan. Yanase Co., Ltd., a Japanese retail dealership that started importing European and North American vehicles soon after the end of World War II, sold various GM products including the Cavalier. When the decision was made to sell the Cavalier as a Toyota, this disrupted operations at Yanase. When the Toyota Cavalier was cancelled, Yanase continued to sell Chevrolet and other GM products. Yanase also provides complete maintenance services for all vehicles sold.

Due to higher than typically average vehicle inspection costs, a fair number of these vehicles are re-exported as Japanese used cars, most notably to Australia and New Zealand. Production of the Toyota Cavalier ceased in June 2000. Despite Toyota making considerable efforts to sell the Cavalier on the domestic market, the Japanese public perceived the quality of workmanship to not be up to the standard typically expected of locally built cars. The car was also introduced while Japan was in a recession following the 1991 collapse of the Japanese asset price bubble or "bubble economy."

The Toyota Cavalier was raced in the GT300 class of the JGTC from 1997 to 1998, without much success.

Production 
Most Cavaliers were built at Lordstown Assembly, although they have also been produced at South Gate Assembly (1982 model year only), Lansing Car Assembly (1995-1998 coupes), Lansing Craft Centre (1996-2000 convertibles), Janesville Assembly, Ramos Arizpe, and Leeds Assembly. The Cavalier was discontinued in 2005.

Fourth generation (2016) 

Chevrolet reintroduced the Cavalier name on a new China-only compact sedan below the Cruze, with the Chinese name being Chevrolet Kewozi (科沃兹). The Cavalier was introduced at the 2016 Chengdu Auto Show on September 2, 2016. It was developed on the same platform as the first generation Cruze, the Delta II platform, and uses the 1.5-liter four-cylinder engine that powers many compact GM models in China, including the Chevrolet Sail. Its pricing sets the Cavalier exactly between the smaller Sail and the more modern second generation Cruze. Deliveries started in September, with almost 10,000 units sold in its first month, but there are indications the Cavalier cannibalizes sales of the similarly priced first-generation Cruze, which continues to be sold in China. As of 2018, the fourth-generation Cavalier is also sold in Mexico with the same name, replacing the Chevrolet Sonic. There, the 1.5 L engine produces  and  torque.

The Cavalier was updated for the 2020 model year for Mexico with minor changes, adding three new colors, new alloy design, four airbags and ABS brakes, three-point seatbelts, and stability control as well as minor changes to the interior for the LT trim line including a 7" with Chevrolet myLink and Smartphone Integration for Apple CarPlay. The 2020 Cavalier went on sale on 23 September 2019. In 2019, the car was discontinued in the Chinese domestic market after being replaced by the Chevrolet Monza (科鲁泽), although it continued to be built for export. The 科沃兹 (kewozi) name is now used on the Chevrolet Onix, which is positioned below the Monza.

Fifth generation (2021) 

The fifth-generation Cavalier is marketed in Mexico since in late 2021 as a 2022 model. It is a rebadged version of the Chevrolet Monza sedan produced in China. Reflecting the new engine, it is marketed as the Cavalier Turbo.

Sales

Engines 
 1982 — 1.8 L OHV 2-barrel inline-4, 88 horsepower
 mid 1982–1984 — 2.0 L OHV 2-barrel inline-4, 90 horsepower
 1983–1989 — 2.0 L OHV TBI inline-4, 86 horsepower (1983–1984), 88 horsepower (1985–1986), 90 horsepower (1987–89)
 1985–1989 — 2.8 L OHV MPFI V6, 120-130 horsepower (125 in 1985, 120 in 1986, 130 in 1987, 125 in 1988, and 130 in 1989)
 1990–1994 — 2.8 L OHV MPFI V6, 130 horsepower (Mexico and Venezuela only, *Colombia used a version of 116 hp.
 1990–1991 — 2.2 L OHV TBI inline-4, 
 1990–1994 — 3.1 L OHV MPFI V6, 
 1992–2002 — 2.2 L OHV MPFI L4, 110 horsepower (1992–93), 120 horsepower (1994–97, 1994 upgrade to SFI), 115 horsepower (1998–2002)
 1995 — 2.3 L DOHC MPFI Quad 4, 
 1996–2002 — 2.4 L DOHC SFI L4, 
 2002–2005 — 2.2 L DOHC Ecotec SFI L4,

References

External links 

 

Cavalier
Compact cars
Convertibles
Coupés
Front-wheel-drive vehicles
Hatchbacks
Sedans
Station wagons
1990s cars
2000s cars
Vehicles built in Lansing, Michigan
Cars introduced in 1981
2010s cars
Motor vehicles manufactured in the United States